Teschenhagen is a railway station in the town of Sehlen, Mecklenburg-Vorpommern, Germany. The station lies on the Stralsund-Sassnitz railway and the train services are operated by Deutsche Bahn.

Train services
The station is served by the following service(s):

Regional services  Rostock - Velgast - Stralsund - Lietzow - Sassnitz/Binz

References

Rügen
Railway stations in Mecklenburg-Western Pomerania

Railway stations in Germany opened in 1883
Buildings and structures in Vorpommern-Rügen